Martti Ilmari Simojoki, previously Simelius (September 17, 1908 in Uusikaupunki – April 25, 1999 in Helsinki) was the Archbishop of Turku, and the spiritual head of the Evangelical Lutheran Church of Finland between 1964 and 1978. Simojoki became the first bishop of the Diocese of Helsinki that was established in 1959.

Simojoki is known for his criticism of Hannu Salama's book Juhannustanssit in 1964, which led to author's conviction for blasphemy.

He is buried in the Hietaniemi Cemetery in Helsinki.

Notes

External links
Biografiakeskus: Martti Simojoki 
Archbishops of Turku: Martti Simojoki 

1908 births
1999 deaths
People from Uusikaupunki
People from Turku and Pori Province (Grand Duchy of Finland)
Lutheran archbishops and bishops of Turku
Lutheran bishops of Helsinki
20th-century Lutheran archbishops
Burials at Hietaniemi Cemetery